The Audi 80 is a compact executive car produced by the Audi subdivision of the Volkswagen Group across four generations from 1966 to 1996. It shared its platform with the Volkswagen Passat from 1973 to 1986 and was available as a saloon, and station wagon — the latter marketed by Audi as the Avant. The coupé and convertible models were not badged as members of the range but used a derivative of the same platforms.

In North America and Australia, the 80 was marketed as the Audi Fox for model years 1973–79, and as the Audi 4000 for model years 1980–87 in the US. The Audi 90 was an upmarket version of the Audi 80, although all North American sedans of the B4 generation were called Audi 90.

Naming convention
Under Audi's platform numbering convention, the 80 is classified as a member of the B-series or B platform family of vehicles, with the four generations of 80 being numbered as B1, B2, B3 and B4; its replacement – the Audi A4 – continues this sequence with platform numbers B5 through to B9. Originally this numbering convention ran concurrently with that of the Volkswagen Passat, the first generation of which was essentially a badge engineered clone of the Audi 80.  This link was severed in 1988 when the Passat moved to a non-related, transverse-engined, VW-specific platform for its 80-unrelated B3 and B4 versions. The Passat was based again on the Audi A4 (B5 or "8D" platform) for its B5 generation, and returned to a transverse engine for the B6 and later generations.

F103 (1966–1972)

The Audi F103 series, based on the DKW F102 but with an all-new range of four-stroke engines developed in conjunction with Daimler-Benz, was sold between 1965 and 1972. It comprised several models named for their horsepower ratings. From 1966 to 1969 this series included an Audi 80, and there were also Audi 60, 72, 75, and Super 90 models available over the years.

B1 (1972–1978)

This model debuted in Europe in 1972 as the Audi 80, and in 1973 in Australia and North America (Canada and the USA) as the Audi Fox, and was available as either a two-door or a four-door saloon (sedan). It effectively took the place of several models that Audi had discontinued (the F103 series, which included the first model designated as an "Audi 80"), and provided the company with a viable rival to the Opel Ascona and the Ford Taunus (Ford Cortina in the UK), as well as more upmarket offerings including the Alfa Romeo Alfetta and Triumph Dolomite.

The Audi 80 B1 was only the second modern-era Audi product to be developed entirely under Volkswagen ownership - Audi chief engineer Ludwig Kraus had famously been disparaging about the outgoing F103 series, referring to it as the "bastard", owing to its Auto Union/DKW bodyshell and Mercedes-Benz engine. The B1 was a clean break from the Auto Union era, being equipped with.a range of brand new 1.3- and 1.5-litre SOHC inline-four petrol engines - the first appearance of the now legendary EA827 series of engines, whose descendants are still used in VW Group vehicles to the present day. The internal combustion engines were available in various rated power outputs.

On the home market, two- and four- door saloons were available in base trim (55 or 60 PS, called simply Audi 80 and 80 S, respectively), as L models (LS with 75 PS engine) or as a more luxurious GL (85 PS only).

The Audi 80 had a MacPherson strut front suspension, and a C-section beam rear axle located by trailing arms and a Panhard rod, and using coil springs and telescopic dampers.

Audi's design and development efforts paid off during the 1973 European Car of the Year competition where the 80 won ahead of the Renault 5 and the Alfa Romeo Alfetta.

A facelift in autumn 1976 brought about a revised front end in the style of the newly introduced Audi 100 C2 with square instead of round headlights, 1.6- instead of 1.5-litre engines (still of 75/85 PS) and a new 80 GTE model with a fuel-injected version of the 1.6-litre replacing the former 80 GT.

In certain markets a five-door "Avant" (Audi's name for an estate/wagon) variant was offered — effectively a rebadged Volkswagen Passat with Audi front panels. This version, first seen in mid-1975, appeared in the United States, South Africa, and several other markets.

Four-speed manuals or three-speed automatics were on offer, in all three bodystyles. Aside from the required larger bumpers, early models looked very similar to their European counterparts, while facelift versions (model year 1977) received a large black grille with double, round headlights, without the wraparound turn signals used elsewhere. There was also a sporting GTi package on offer in later years. The B1 platform was dropped from the European market in 1978, although it was sold into the 1979 model year in North America.

B2 (1978–1986)

Audi presented a redesigned 80 based on the B2 platform (Typ 81) in September 1978 and deliveries of the four-door sedan began a few weeks later in Europe. Deliveries of the fuel injected GLE and two door bodied cars began early in 1979. The redesigned car was first seen in North America in 1979 (as a 1980 model). Audi continued to use the 80 nameplate in Europe, but badged their Typ 81 as the Audi 4000 in North America. The body of the B2 Audi 80 was designed by Giorgetto Giugiaro. No Avant variant was available, as the Volkswagen Passat filled that role, as the B2 was intended to move the 80 upmarket from the mid-sized family segment to a compact executive model pitched to rival the BMW 3 Series. The B2 also acted in a de facto sense, as a replacement for the ill-fated NSU Ro 80 which ceased production the year before, since Audi dropped the NSU brand completely following that car's demise. The corresponding B2 version of the Passat appeared two years later, and although the two cars shared the same platform and running gear as before, the Passat had a much stronger visual identity distinct from its Audi 80 sister in comparison with the B1.

The 80 first became available with four-wheel drive in 1983. The model was essentially an Ur-Quattro without the turbocharger and with saloon bodywork. The four-wheel drive 80, however, weighed more than a front-wheel drive Audi 100 CD with the same 2144 cc  engine, and with its worse aerodynamics it was slower than the larger, better equipped, and lower-priced 100. Top speeds are  respectively, with similar fuel economy advantages for the larger 100. The 80 quattro received twin headlamps, a front spoiler with integrated foglights, and a body-coloured rubber spoiler on the rear. There was also a "quattro" script on the bootlid and a twin exhaust. The luggage compartment was marginally smaller (mostly in height), which meant only a temporary spare tire could be fitted. The 80 quattro was a bargain compared to the Ur-Quattro, but less so in comparison with the two-wheel drive 80 GTE or the 100 CD, although they did not offer the impressive road holding that the quattros do.

European models had two headlamp casings, while North American models generally had quad headlamps.

In 1983, the 80 Sport was introduced in the UK, based on the GTE. It came with quattro-style Ronal alloys, rubber rear spoiler, deep chin spoiler, striped charcoal Recaro interior, and optional body graphics including full-length "Audi Sport" stripes.

1984 facelift 

Mid-1984, for the 1985 model year, Audi gave the B2 a subtle facelift with tail lights resembling the ones of the Typ 44 Audi 100, and different front and rear bumpers and headlights and an updated interior. In Europe, engines with catalytic converter emissions controls were made available for the first time. The 1.6- and 1.8-litre engines were replaced by newer iterations of the same, enabling the fitment of catalytic converters.

The B2 platform proved to be both quite versatile and quite profitable; many components were shared to or borrowed from the Audi Coupé, Audi Quattro and Audi Sport Quattro, which in the process helped to cement the company into the public eye after their quattro permanent four-wheel-drive system proved useful in various forms of racing.

The saloons were offered until late 1986 in Europe and 1987 abroad, and the B2-based Audi Coupé lasted through to 1988 (as an early 1989 model) before being changed. The Coupé shared many components, and its basic body shape, with the original Audi Quattro.

4000 (North America)
This engine came in for some criticism, being somewhat buzzy and underpowered for a car in this price segment. Audi did not offer an automatic transmission, as the engine could not quite cope. A five-speed transmission was also not available until the 1981 model year. For 1981, the 4000 received a long-stroke 1.7-litre engine and a standard five-speed manual (with a three-speed automatic still available). Nonetheless, more torque and the new gearbox translated into better performance and improved gas mileage.

The Audi 4000 5+5 was launched onto the American market in the 1981 model year. The 5+5 was essentially an 80 B2 two-door saloon with the  2144 cc five-cylinder engine from the 5000 and a five-speed transmission, the precursor to what would become the Audi 90. It was fitted with various sporty parts such as an oil pressure gauge, sports interior, and alloy wheels as standard equipment.

It was accompanied on the American market by the 4000S. This is a more pedestrian yet well-equipped four-door version with the same engine, originally only coupled to a three-speed automatic.

After a facelift it was sold in North America in 4000S (1.8-litre) and 4000S/CS quattro (2.2-litre) derivatives, with the S and CS quattros being very similar to the European Audi 90 quattro. The Audi 4000 quattro debuted in 1984 and was sold in four colors, Black, Alpine White, Tornado Red, and optional Zermatt Silver metallic. It came standard with a five-speed manual transmission, brown velour interior, and automatic windows up front and manuals in the rear. The early Audi 4000's were very similar to the Audi 80 with the addition of US mandated crash safety bumpers and quad sealed beam headlights. The mounting for the safety bumpers intruded into the luggage compartment floor, making for a very irregularly shaped and less useful space.

The S has a 1.8-litre inline-four-cylinder engine that puts out  at 5500 rpm. The CS quattro has a CIS-E fuel-injected 2.2-litre inline-five cylinder petrol engine (identification code: JT). It displaces 2226 cc and was constructed from a grey cast-iron cylinder block, with an aluminium alloy cylinder head, and uses a timing belt-driven single overhead camshaft (SOHC). The only transmission available on the 4000CS was a five-speed close-ratio manual.

Audi 5+5 (Australia)
The Audi 5+5 name was used in the Australian market for a unique four door Audi 80 fitted with a 2144 cc five cylinder engine and a five speed manual gearbox. An automatic option was also offered. The 5+5 was marketed in Australia from October 1981 through to 1983.

Gallery

B3 (1986–1992)

In September 1986, Audi released a new Typ 89 Audi 80 for the 1987 model year on the European market and introduced it elsewhere within a year. It was based on a new platform which broke the relationship between the 80 and the Volkswagen Passat, the corresponding third generation of which used the transverse-engined Volkswagen B3 platform, whilst Audi stuck with the longitudinal front wheel drive layout for the B3-series 80. Production codes were Typ 89 from 1987 to 1989, and Typ 8A from 1990 onwards (in line with a restructuring of many VW platform designations). It introduced a new aerodynamic look and a fully zinc coated galvanised bodyshell.

Unlike its predecessor, the B3 was marketed worldwide only as the Audi 80 or Audi 90. Initially, Audi transferred existing powertrain concepts to the new model although fuel injection was now available for some engines. A range of new petrol and diesel inline four-cylinder engines became available to European customers along with the procon-ten safety system which became standard fitment from 1991.

Procon-ten was a notable safety feature comprising a series of hidden steel cables routed behind the gearbox, attached to the steering wheel and front seatbelt inertia reels. In the event of a front impact, the engine and gearbox are forced rearwards, pulling on these cables. This action simultaneously pulls the steering wheel into the dashboard to prevent the driver colliding with it while tightening the front seatbelts. This innovation was a precursor to the airbag, which became popular on mass produced cars during the 1990s after being patented by Mercedes-Benz in 1982.

In 1987, the Audi 90 was reintroduced as an upmarket, more luxurious variant of the 80. To begin with it would again feature a choice of 10-valve inline five-cylinder petrol engines, and could be specified with or without quattro. The 90 differs visually to the 80 by a full width tail-light panel; headlights which featured additional high-beam lights and a slightly different front grille. Indicator lamps were moved from beside the headlights to the bumpers next to the fog lights, which were standard fitment on the 90. Brightwork surrounds for the windows, tops of the bumpers and side rubbing strips were also standard. Interiors were upgraded over the 80 featuring velour seat coverings and a slightly more generous level of equipment. The then range-topping 2.2E offered a boot spoiler, alloy wheels, leather steering wheel and sports front seats. Switchable ABS was standard on quattro versions.

From 1989 to 1991 the Audi 90 offered the first 20-valve engine from Audi since the turbocharged engine used in the Audi Sport Quattro. This new 2.3L engine produced  and featured in the front wheel drive 20V, 20V Sport and four-wheel drive 20V quattro derivatives. The non-quattro 20V models were 120 kg lighter.

Externally, Sport versions of the 90 were visually distinguished by the deletion of brightwork in favour of satin black window surrounds, bumper cappings and thinner side mouldings. A raised aluminium boot spoiler, lowered suspension and uprated brakes were fitted as standard, Speedline wheels were also standard fitment in the UK.

In October 1988 a Coupé version based on the 80/90 appeared, called simply the Audi Coupé (typ 8B). This had completely different three-door liftback bodywork and replaced the earlier, B2-based Coupé which had been manufactured into early 1988. This version remained in production until 1996, in parallel with the succeeding B4 generation Audi 80. A convertible was planned from the beginning but did not appear until May 1991 as the Audi Cabriolet. This model remained in production until 2000 and was optically aligned with the B4 Audi 80 from its introduction.

Altogether, the Audi 80 came with the following engine range, although not all of these were available in all markets:

The Audi 90 came with the following 5-cylinder engines:

North America
In 1989, for the 1990 model year, North America received the 90 quattro model (and Coupé quattro) that was powered by a detuned  of the 20v 2.3-litre 5-cylinder engine. It was marketed in the "Grand Tourismo" (GT) style of a comfortable luxury car with sporting tendencies, as opposed to a dedicated lightweight sports car. These models can be recognised by their distinctive wheels, 14" BBS Mesh wheels or 15" Six-star Speedlines. They differed from regular 80/90 models in several ways. Notable differences include their standard leather interiors with Zebrano wood trim, additional VDO gauges mounted in the bottom of the centre console, a carbon fibre centre prop shaft, and push-button locking rear differential.

The final type 89 80s and 90s were sold as 1992 models in North America; in Europe, all type 89 sedans were discontinued at the end of the 1991 model year to give way to the B4 series; a few Audi 90 Sport Quattro with the 2.3-litre 20v engine were assembled in early 1992.

B4 (1991–1996)

The Audi 80 (B3) obtained a major facelift in the autumn of 1991, although the UK launch was not until early 1992. It was from then on known internally as the B4 (or Typ 8C). Changes from the B3 included a longer wheelbase, a fully redesigned fuel tank and rear axle to enable the use of folding seats, 15" wheels with more prominent wheel arches, redesigned and painted rear and front bumpers, as well as higher-quality materials for the interior, and a larger boot. The front grille was merged with the bonnet and given a bolder look. This design had been previewed on the 1990 Audi Coupé S2 and was applied to the full lineup of the B3-based Coupés as well in July 1991. The Cabriolet (Typ 8G) had been introduced in May 1991 and continued to be built long after the B4 had been replaced, receiving similar updates to the Audi 80 B4 and succeeding Audi A4.

The B4 also marked the beginning of Audi's move into the German luxury mid-sized vehicle segment, which until then was clearly dominated by Mercedes-Benz and BMW. On the European market, and in Germany in particular, the B4 and its variants were highly successful and popular.

In Europe, the 90 designation for five-cylinder models was dropped for this generation, and all saloons were badged as 80, regardless of which engine they had. Audi of America went the opposite direction, and sold the saloon as the 90. B4s for the American market typically offered more luxury and style even in the standard version, such as automatic transmission, cruise control, air conditioning and leather seats, all of which were usually optional at additional cost on European models.

Because the United States does not recognise the international ECE Regulations on auto safety components and constructions, but rather maintains its own Federal Motor Vehicle Safety Standards, the front of the B4 had to be specially redesigned for vehicles sold in North America. The front and bumper had to be designed to accommodate impact energy absorbers not required outside North America. Instead of the dual-reflector headlamps, a single-reflector design was used inboard of an amber combination turn signal, parking, and side marker lamp and reflector wrapping around the corner, and fog lamps smaller than the rest-of-world items were placed the corners of the bumper air duct.

European market cars were now available with a selection of inline four-cylinder engines, as well as the familiar in-line five, and two different new V6 engines (2.6-litre and 2.8-litre); the later 2.8-litre V6 was the only engine available for vehicles sold in North America. As another first, Audi introduced a new high-torque, direct-injection, turbocharged diesel engine, the  1.9-litre TDI (Turbocharged Direct Injection). The standard 1.8-litre petrol engine of the B3 was discontinued; a two-litre, four-cylinder petrol engine, a variation of the previously known  2.0 E engine, was now available for the base model.

Altogether, although some layouts were not available everywhere outside Germany, Audi offered the following engine range for the 80/90 B4:

Petrol engines:
 1.6 – , in-line four-cylinder (export only)
 1.6 E – , in-line four-cylinder
 1.8 E 20v – , in-line four-cylinder
 2.0 – , in-line four-cylinder (base model in Germany)
 2.0 E – , in-line four-cylinder
 2.0 E 16v – , 16-valve, in-line four-cylinder
 2.3 E 10v – , 10-valve, in-line five-cylinder
 2.6 E – , V6
 2.8 E – , V6
 S2 – , 2.2 L, 20-valve turbocharged in-line five-cylinder
 RS2 Avant – , 2.2 L, 20-valve turbocharged in-line five-cylinder

Diesel engines:
 1.9 TD – , in-line four-cylinder turbodiesel
 1.9 TDI – , in-line four-cylinder direct-injection turbodiesel (with intercooler)

Most petrol versions could be ordered with quattro permanent four-wheel-drive; at the time, however, it could only be combined with a five-speed manual transmission. Additionally, Audi built about 2500 units of the Quattro Competition for the German and European market. It was a street homologation of the B4-based Super Tourenwagen Cup (STW) race car saloon with four-wheel drive and a modified , 16-valve, two-litre petrol engine. The powertrain had its roots in the two-litre, four-cylinder inline engines that most European Audi 80s were equipped with at the time. On the outside, the Quattro Competition featured the same bumpers as the S2, V6 headlights, and a rear wing mounted on the bootlid. Together with the S2 and the RS2 Avant, the Quattro Competition has become an increasingly rare and highly sought-after collector's item.

Together with the saloon, Audi produced a B4-based estate, the Audi 80 Avant, and a convertible, the Audi Cabriolet, which was largely based on the B3 Coupé. This meant that Audi now had saloon, coupé, cabriolet, and estate variants of the 80 available to European customers. For the North American market, however, Audi only sold coupés during the 1990 and 1991 model years, and the station wagon was never officially available.

As of the 1994 model year, a limited edition model, known as Europa, was introduced on the European market. It could be ordered both as a saloon and an Avant. It was factory-equipped with power mirrors, alloy wheels, rear seat headrests, an airbag steering wheel, and offered a choice between power sunroof or air conditioning. It came in five different special colours. For "regular" 1994 B4 saloons and Avants, standard features as well as options available were stepped up too, including an airbag steering wheel and redesigned door liners (standard), and passenger airbags and a built-in engine immobiliser (optional).

The 80-series was effectively replaced by the new Audi A4 in 1996, a variant of the 1998 (B5) Volkswagen Passat. By that time it was feeling very dated in comparison with more modern rivals like the BMW E36. Production ceased at a time when prestige European manufacturers were making the transition of older executive saloons to newer models based on newer platforms in the compact executive car market.

The B4 saloon was discontinued at the end of the 1994. The Avant (only built for left-hand drive markets and never sold in the UK) was axed in 1995, and the Coupé (with no immediate replacement) followed suit in 1996. The Cabriolet, however, continued in production until August 2000. The B4 platform saloon was replaced by the Audi A4 for the 1995 model year (1996 in North America), followed by a new A4 Avant later in 1996 - sold in right-hand drive for the UK market for the first time. A mid-sized convertible was not available again until 2002, when the A4 Cabriolet was introduced. Since 2007, Audi has produced Audi A5 - which is similar in concept to the old 80-based Coupé.

Audi S2

Audi developed a sports version of the Coupé in 1990, called the Audi Coupé S2. This replaced the famous Audi Quattro and was capable of 150 mph. In 1993, the S2 received some cosmetic updates, including new AVUS-style alloy wheels, ellipsoid beam (projector) headlamps and clear front indicator lenses. This coincided with the introduction of the five-door S2 Avant, along with a limited run of four-door S2 sedan models, of which 306 were produced. The S2 saloon and Avant feature a lot of similarities in the rear axle support system to the later B5 A4 quattro. The B4 platform S2 Avant was also used between 1993 and 1995 as the basis for Audi's RS2 Avant super-sports estate, which was modified for Audi with assistance from Porsche.

Audi RS2 Avant

The Audi RS2 Avant is fitted with a similar 2.2-litre turbocharged engine to the S2, but producing .

The Audi RS2 was generally only available as an Avant, although four 4-door saloon models were officially produced by the factory, including one for the chief of the RS2 development programme. The RS2 was at least partially assembled at Porsche's Rossle-Bau plant in Zuffenhausen. Prior to manufacturing the RS2, the Porsche Zuffenhausen assembly line was busy producing the high-performance W124 bodystyle Mercedes-Benz 500E. The RS2/Porsche link is further exemplified by the RS2's dual circuit Porsche braking system (wearing Brembo calipers with a Porsche name), 7.0Jx17" alloy wheels which were identical in design to the Porsche 911 Turbo wheels of that era, and side view mirrors are also borrowed from the Porsche 911 Turbo. Additionally, the word "PORSCHE" is inscribed in the RS2 factory emblems affixed to the tailgate and front grille, and on the engine's inlet manifold. Porsche modified the Avant S2 body optics, added more power, better brakes, bigger anti-roll bars to front and rear, fine tuned the interior – and a super-sports estate was born. Porsche's involvement in the project was on the strict understanding that a coupé model would not be produced, as this was felt to be too close to Porsche's own products.

Type codes
Audi assigned its individual models "Typ" codes, in addition to the primary Volkswagen Group B platform codes:
 F103 – Audi 80 (1966–1969)
 Typ 80 – B1; Audi 80 (1972–1976)
 Typ 82/33 – B1; Audi 80 (1976–1978)
 Typ 81 – B2; Audi 80/90 (4000 in US) (1979–1987); Audi Coupé (1980–1987)
 Typ 85 – B2; Audi Coupé quattro (1984–1988); Audi Quattro (1981–1991); Audi 80/90/4000 quattro (1984–1987); Audi Sport Quattro (1984–1987)
 Typ 89/8A – B3; Audi 80/90 (1986–1992)
 Typ 89Q – B3; Audi 80/90 quattro (1986–1992)
 Typ 8B – B3; Audi Coupé (1989–1996); Audi S2 (1991–1996)
 Typ 8C – B4; Audi 80 (1992–1995); Audi RS2 Avant (1994–1996)
 Typ 8G – B4; Audi Cabriolet (1991–2000)

Motorsport

The Audi 90 is best known for its heavy dominance in the IMSA GT Championship under the IMSA GTO category as well as in the Trans Am Series in the late eighties.

See also
 Audi Coupé/Cabriolet
 Audi RS2 Avant

Works cited

Notes

References

External links

 Audi.com Audi corporate website

80
Executive cars
Mid-size cars
Sedans
Station wagons
Convertibles
Front-wheel-drive vehicles
All-wheel-drive vehicles
Cars introduced in 1966
Cars introduced in 1972
1980s cars
1990s cars
Touring cars
Group 4 (racing) cars